Mirko Pehar (born 5 August 1980) is a retired American tennis player.

Pehar has a career high ATP singles ranking of 582 achieved on 22 April 2002. He also has a career high doubles ranking of 122 achieved on 3 April 2006.

Pehar has won two ATP Challenger doubles titles in the 2005 season. He made his main draw debut on the ATP Tour at the 2005 Croatia Open Umag partnering Goran Dragicevic in the doubles competition.

Since his retirement as active tennis player, he became part of the coaching team of his friend Ivo Karlović.

ATP Challenger and ITF Futures finals

Singles: 1 (0–1)

Doubles: 38 (11–27)

References

External links
 
 

1980 births
Living people
American male tennis players
Croatian male tennis players
American people of Croatian descent